George Edwin Scott (22 June 1925 – 2 November 1988), was a British author, television commentator, broadcaster, journalist and Liberal Party politician. He was editor of The Listener for five years.

Background
Scott was born the son of George Benjamin Scott and Florence Hilda Scott. He was educated at Middlesbrough High School and New College, Oxford, from 1946 to 1948. From 1943 to 1946 he served in the Royal Navy Volunteer Reserve. In 1947 he married Shelagh Maud Isobel Maw. They had one daughter, Susan (1949-1983) and two sons, Alexander (1955-2008) and Daniel (1962- ).

Professional career
Scott was a journalist who worked on the Northern Echo (1941–42), Yorkshire Post (1942–43) and the Daily Express (1948–53). He moved to work on the periodical Truth in 1953. He became deputy editor in 1954 and editor from 1954 to 1957, when it ceased publication. In 1956 his auto-biographical work Time and Place was published.  He became a television broadcaster, first as a member of the Panorama team (1958–59). He was chairman and interviewer for Television Wales and the West (1959–67). He had spells working at Rediffusion (1966–68) and Tyne-Tees (1970–74). He returned to journalism to work for The Economist from 1970 to 1974. He wrote Rise and Fall of the League of Nations in 1973. He was editor of The Listener from 1974 to 1979. He was presenter of The Editors on the BBC from 1976 to 1979. He was head of the UK Offices of the EEC from 1979 to 1987. He was Special Adviser to the Commission of the European Communities from 1987 to 1988.

Political career
Scott was chairman of the Political Division of the Liberal Party from 1962 to 1963. He was Liberal candidate for the Middlesbrough East division at the 1962 by-election. He was Liberal candidate for the Middlesbrough West division at the 1962 by-election. He was Liberal candidate for the Wimbledon division at the 1964 general election. He was Liberal candidate for the South West Surrey division at the 1983 general election. He did not stand for parliament again.

Electoral record

References

External links

1925 births
1988 deaths
Liberal Party (UK) parliamentary candidates
Alumni of New College, Oxford
Royal Naval Volunteer Reserve personnel of World War II